Coleophora mendica is a moth of the family Coleophoridae. It is found in Spain.

References

melanograpta
Moths described in 2000
Moths of Europe